The 2019 Grand Prix Hassan II was a professional tennis tournament played on clay courts. It was the 35th edition of the tournament and part of the 2019 ATP Tour. It took place in Marrakesh, Morocco between 8 and 14 April 2019.

Singles main-draw entrants

Seeds 

 1 Rankings are as of April 1, 2019.

Other entrants 
The following players received wildcards into the singles main draw:
  Fabio Fognini
  Jo-Wilfried Tsonga
  Alexander Zverev

The following player received entry using a protected ranking into the singles main draw:
  Cedrik-Marcel Stebe

The following players received entry from the qualifying draw:
  Facundo Bagnis 
  Alejandro Davidovich Fokina
  Adrián Menéndez Maceiras 
  Lorenzo Sonego

The following player received entry as a lucky loser:
  Carlos Berlocq

Withdrawals 
Before the tournament
  Félix Auger-Aliassime → replaced by  Carlos Berlocq
  Matteo Berrettini → replaced by  Denis Istomin
  Pablo Carreño Busta → replaced by  Pablo Andújar
  Damir Džumhur → replaced by  Albert Ramos Viñolas
  Hubert Hurkacz → replaced by  Jiří Veselý
  Mikhail Kukushkin → replaced by  Cedrik-Marcel Stebe
  John Millman → replaced by  Jozef Kovalík
  João Sousa → replaced by  Thomas Fabbiano

During the tournament
  Jiří Veselý

Doubles main-draw entrants

Seeds 

 Rankings are as of April 1, 2019.

Other entrants 
The following pairs received wildcards into the doubles main draw:
  Amine Ahouda /  Adam Moundir 
  Anas Fattar /  Lamine Ouahab

Retirements 
  Michael Venus
  Joran Vliegen

Champions

Singles 

  Benoît Paire def.  Pablo Andújar, 6–2, 6–3

Doubles 

  Jürgen Melzer /  Franko Škugor def.  Matwé Middelkoop /  Frederik Nielsen, 6–4, 7–6(8–6)

Notes

References

External links